I Need You is an extended play by the American pop group The Walker Brothers. It was released in 1966 reached number one on the UK EP Chart. It was released following the group's second UK #1 single when the group were at the height of their popularity.

The EP was produced by John Franz, Ivor Raymonde and Reg Guest directed the musical accompaniment and the group's live backing band The Quotations performed on "Everything's Gonna Be All Right". The EP is also notable as it includes the original Scott Walker and John Franz composition "Young Man Cried". In Australia "Young Man Cried" was omitted from the EP and replaced with the album track "Land of 1,000 Dances" from the group's debut album.

All four tracks have since been re-released on the expanded edition of the group's début album.

Track listing
 Philips - 434 568 BE (UK)

 Philips - PE 45 (Australia)

Personnel
 Ivor Raymonde - Accompaniment Direction ("Looking For Me")
 Reg Guest - Accompaniment Direction ("Young Man Cried" and "I Need You")
 The Quotations - Featured ("Everything's Gonna Be All Right")

Chart positions

References

1966 debut EPs
The Walker Brothers EPs